Charles L. Plummer is a United States Air Force lieutenant general who serves as the judge advocate general of the United States Air Force and Space Force. He previously served as the deputy judge advocate general of the United States Air Force.

References

External links
 

|-

Living people
People from Reno, Nevada
Place of birth missing (living people)
Recipients of the Legion of Merit
United States Air Force generals
Year of birth missing (living people)